CBOQ-FM is a Canadian radio station. It broadcasts the Canadian Broadcasting Corporation's CBC Music network at 103.3 FM in Ottawa, Ontario. CBOQ's studios are located in the CBC Ottawa Broadcast Centre on Queen Street (across from the Confederation Line light rail station) in Downtown Ottawa, while its transmitter is located in Camp Fortune, Quebec.

The station was launched on February 27, 1948 as CBO-FM. It adopted its current callsign in 1991, when its AM sister station CBO moved to the FM band.

External links
 CBC Ottawa
 

BOQ
BOQ
Radio stations established in 1947
1947 establishments in Ontario